"Never Be Alone" is a song by French DJ David Guetta and Danish DJ and producer Morten, featuring vocals from American singer and songwriter Aloe Blacc. It was released as a single on 19 July 2019 by record label What a Music. The song was written by David Guetta, Giorgio Tuinfort, Aloe Blacc, Morten Breum, Mike Hawkins and Toby Green.

Track listing

Charts

Weekly charts

Year-end charts

References

2019 songs
2019 singles
David Guetta songs
Aloe Blacc songs
Songs written by David Guetta
Songs written by Giorgio Tuinfort
Song recordings produced by David Guetta
Songs written by Aloe Blacc